is a Japanese football player. She plays for Bunnys Kyoto SC. She played for Japan national team.

Club career
Kado was born in Kurashiki on June 19, 1990. In 2004, she joined her local club, Okayama Yunogo Belle. In June 2017, she left the club due to injury. Over 14 seasons, she played 200 matches and scored 37 goals. In 2018, she joined Bunnys Kyoto SC.

National team career
Kado was a member of the Japan U-20 national team in the 2008 and 2010 U-20 World Cups. In March 2013, she was selected for the Japan national team for the 2013 Algarve Cup. At that competition on March 6, she played against Norway. She played three games for Japan in 2013.

National team statistics

References

External links

1990 births
Living people
Association football people from Okayama Prefecture
Japanese women's footballers
Japan women's international footballers
Nadeshiko League players
Okayama Yunogo Belle players
Bunnys Kyoto SC players
Women's association football midfielders